Malpresentation of fetus can refer to:

 Asynclitic birth
 Breech birth